The , is the Cabinet of Japan member in charge of the issue of North Korean abductions of Japanese citizens. 

As of 7 October 2015, the minister in charge of the abduction issue is Katsunobu Katō.

List of Ministers for the Abduction Issue

References

ja:拉致問題対策本部#構成員